The rufus snake eel (Ophichthus rufus) is an eel in the family Ophichthidae (worm/snake eels). It was described by Constantine Samuel Rafinesque in 1810, originally under the genus Echelus. It is a marine, subtropical eel which is known from throughout the Mediterranean and the Black Sea, in the northeastern Atlantic Ocean, including Algeria, Albania, Croatia, Egypt, France, Cyprus, Gibraltar, Greece, Italy, Israel, Montenegro, Lebanon, Libya, Malta, Morocco, Monaco, Slovenia, Spain, Tunisia, the Syrian Arab Republic, and Turkey. It inhabits mud sediments on the continental shelf.

The rufus snake-eel's diet consists of bony fish, mollusks and benthic crustaceans. It has been recorded spawning from July to October, in the Mediterranean. Due to its wide distribution and abundant population, as well as a lack of known major threats, the IUCN redlist currently lists the rufus snake-eel as Least Concern

References

Taxa named by Constantine Samuel Rafinesque
Fish described in 1810
Ophichthus